William Cubitt (1791 – 28 October 1863), lord mayor of London, was an English engineering contractor and Conservative Party politician.

Career
William was a partner in the building firm established by his elder brother, Thomas Cubitt, at Gray's Inn Road but in about 1827 the partnership was dissolved leaving William solely in charge of the business.

William built Covent Garden completed in 1830 and Fishmongers' Hall completed in 1834. He also built the portico and the original station buildings at Euston completed in 1837. He was also responsible for the reclaiming and development of Cubitt Town in southern Poplar on the Isle of Dogs completed in 1850. He retired completely from the business in 1851. In 1883 the business was acquired by Holland & Hannen, a leading competitor, and the combined business became known as Holland & Hannen and Cubitts and subsequently as Holland, Hannen & Cubitts.

William also had a younger brother, Lewis, a leading designer of his day.

William sat as a Member of Parliament (MP) for Andover from 1847 until 1861. He then resigned his seat on 23 July 1861 by accepting appointment as Steward of the Manor of Hempholme so that he could contest a by-election for the City of London, which he lost. He was re-elected for Andover on 17 December 1862 and served until his death on 28 October 1863.

William became active in the politics of the City of London. He was Sheriff of London and Middlesex in 1847, an Alderman of the City in 1851, represented the city on the Metropolitan Board of Works from 1856, served as Lord Mayor of London in 1860–61 and was re-elected in 1861–62. He was the most recent Lord Mayor to serve more than a single term until William Russell in 2020.

He died in Andover aged 72.

Family
In 1814 he married Elizabeth Scarlett; they had a son and four daughters.

References

External links 

1791 births
1863 deaths
Conservative Party (UK) MPs for English constituencies
UK MPs 1847–1852
UK MPs 1852–1857
UK MPs 1857–1859
UK MPs 1859–1865
Sheriffs of the City of London
19th-century lord mayors of London
19th-century English politicians
British railway civil engineers
People of the Industrial Revolution
Members of the Metropolitan Board of Works
William